Sea Fury may refer to:

 Hawker Sea Fury, a British fighter aircraft developed for the Royal Navy
 Sea Fury (1958 film), a British action film
 Sea Fury (1929 film), an American adventure film